The following is a list of the Gold Coast Football Club senior coaches in each of their seasons in the Australian Football League.

Statistics current to the end of the 2017 season.

Notes

Key

References

Gold Coast Coaches Win/Loss Records

Gold Coast Suns
Gold Coast Suns
Gold Coast, Queensland-related lists